Preparing for Emergencies was a public information campaign produced by the Home Office, a department of the United Kingdom Government, advising British citizens on what to do in the event of a natural disaster, accident or terrorism. The campaign began on 26 July 2004 in the wake of several major disasters including the 11 March 2004 Madrid train bombings, SARS and the 2001 UK foot and mouth crisis, in the form of a 22-page booklet which covered topics such as transport accidents, health, foot and mouth disease, terrorism and fire safety.

The booklet was distributed to all UK households but received some criticism – comparing it to Protect and Survive, a 1980s series of public information films and a booklet that instructed people on how to remain safe from nuclear war. Some sections of the media also accused the government of "scaremongering", although information was provided on topics other than terrorism.

Soon after the website accompanying the booklet was launched, a parody website under the URL www.preparingforemergencies.co.uk was created by English web developer Tom Scott. Said to be from "HM Department of Vague Paranoia", it parodied the seemingly obvious advice given by the booklets, and gave advice such as: "Alien Invasion: Negotiate using sign language, if possible. Failing that, and assuming they aren't armed with futuristic ray guns, run like hell." The Home Office initially objected to the website, stating that the URL was too similar to that of their own website, www.preparingforemergencies.gov.uk, and demanded the website be taken down. However, after a link to the official website was added, the Home Office conceded the issue, and allowed the site to remain online.

Following the original distribution, no more booklets have been produced, although the website was updated with advice on possible bird flu epidemics and the 7 July 2005 London bombings.

In 2011–2012 the website was permanently closed, and official emergency preparedness information for the UK was moved to the gov.uk website. As of 2023, the spoof website is still online.

Logo

The components of the logo are used to indicate resources or actions to follow during an emergency. From left to right, they are:
"i" on blue background - Information
"999" on purple background - What to do in an emergency (Emergency Services)
Right arrow on green background - Go in
Lock on red background - Stay in
Dash on yellow background - Tune in (to local radio or television)
Cross on turquoise background - Administer first aid
The logo is still used by local government organizations giving information on civil defense. The development of the logo cost £17,000 in 2004.

See also
Protect and Survive
Ready.gov, the United States Department of Homeland Security version. Note that it was also parodied by giving alternate interpretations for various images.

References

External links
Preparing for Emergencies - current advice
Spoof version of Preparing for Emergencies
Preparing for Emergencies - archive of the website from The National Archives (United Kingdom) from September 2012, shortly before Directgov was replaced by gov.uk
The Preparing for Emergencies booklet - archive at The National Archives

Emergency management in the United Kingdom